VfL Wolfsburg had their best ever season under new coach Felix Magath. The double Bundesliga-winning coach from Bayern Munich improved the fortunes of Wolfsburg from a relegation-threatened side to a fifth place-finish. This was just the start of a sensational ascent to the top of German football, culminating in a shock title win the season afterwards. New signings Diego Benaglio, Josué, Grafite and Edin Džeko were all successful and played a big part in the resurgence.

Players

First-team squad
Squad at end of season

Left club during season

Results

Bundesliga

Top Scorers
  Grafite 11 (2)
  Edin Džeko 8
  Ashkan Dejagah 8
  Marcelinho 6
  Jacek Krzynówek 4
  Marcel Schäfer 4

Sources
  BetExploer - German Bundesliga 2007/2008

Notes

VfL Wolfsburg seasons
Wolfsburg